Macrolepiota mastoidea is a species of mushroom producing fungus in the family Agaricaceae.

Taxonomy 
It was first described by many mycologists throughout the 1800s and classified variously as Agaricus gracilentus, Agaricus mastoideus, Agaricus umbonatus with each synonym then undergoing its own extensive period of reclassification. It got its current name Macrolepiota mastoidea in 1951 when classified by the German mycologist Rolf Singer.

Habitat and distribution 
This species is found in Europe.

Edibility 
This is reported to be an edible species but it is noted that it can appear similar to some toxic Chlorophyllum species so caution is recommended.

References

External links

Edible fungi
Agaricaceae